Gillese is a surname. Notable people with the surname include:

Eileen E. Gillese, Canadian judge
John Patrick Gillese (1920–1999), Irish-born Canadian author
Kevin Gillese (born 1980), Canadian actor, writer, and improvisor

See also
Gilles (given name)